Şirvanlı (known as Jarski until 1998) is a village and municipality in the Neftchala Rayon of Azerbaijan. It has a population of 478.

References

Populated places in Neftchala District